John Noakes  (born John Wallace Bottomley; 6 March 1934 – 28 May 2017) was an English television presenter and former actor. He co-presented the BBC children's magazine programme Blue Peter in the 1960s and 1970s and was the show's longest-serving presenter, with a tenure that lasted 12 years and six months.

Early life 
Noakes was born John Bottomley, at the Royal Halifax Infirmary in Halifax, West Riding of Yorkshire, to Sallie Hinchcliffe (née Hampson) and Arthur Wallace Bottomley. He was educated at Shelf Council School, in Shelf and then at Rishworth School, where he excelled in cross country running and gymnastics. His parents divorced when he was nine and he went to live with his grandmother.

At the age of 16, Noakes joined the Royal Air Force as a mechanic. The following year, his mother married Canadian big band trumpeter Alfred "Alfie" Noakes (1903–1982) and John took his surname. He subsequently worked for BOAC as an aircraft engine fitter.

Acting
When Noakes decided to become an actor, he took lessons at London's Guildhall School of Music and Drama, which he paid for by doing a cleaning job and working as a hotel liftboy. He made his stage debut as a dog and a clown in a summer show with Cyril Fletcher. In 1964, he appeared in one episode of the television military police drama series Redcap.

After spending six months in the Broadway production of Arnold Wesker's Chips with Everything, Noakes moved back to the UK to work in rep in Surrey where he met his wife-to-be, Vicky. Noakes recreated his role as Whitey Richardson in the 1963 BBC television adaptation of Chips with Everything. He followed this with the role of Anselme Popinot in mini-series The Rise and Fall of César Birotteau on BBC2, a four-part dramatisation broadcast in June 1965. His last dramatic role on television before joining Blue Peter was in an episode of the crime series Mogul, starring Barry Foster and Geoffrey Keen, broadcast on BBC1 in August 1965.

Blue Peter

Presenter
Noakes got the opportunity to join Blue Peter when producer Biddy Baxter needed a third presenter to join Christopher Trace and Valerie Singleton after the show went from a weekly to a twice-weekly format. Baxter spotted Noakes at the Phoenix Theatre in Leicester where he was playing Willie Mossop in the play Hobson's Choice. Noakes joined Blue Peter as a presenter on 30 December 1965. Peter Purves replaced Trace in 1967, creating the 'Val, John and Pete' line-up which lasted until 1972. When Singleton began to diversify her television career, former Young Generation dancer Lesley Judd joined the team. At a time when most BBC presenters spoke with Received Pronunciation (RP), Noakes's Yorkshire accent was a novelty.

As a Blue Peter presenter, Noakes usually fulfilled the role of action man in the series. Highlights included changing the billboard name for the 1971 premier of Bedknobs and Broomsticks in London's Leicester Square, free-fall parachuting with the RAF's Flying Falcons display team and bobsleighing (his sled hit a hole in the ice and turned over, injuring him). After a  free-fall with the RAF in 1973, Noakes held the record for a while for the longest free-fall parachute jump by a British civilian.

Alongside his Blue Peter work, Noakes also presented the BBC's Christmas edition of Disney Time with his Blue Peter colleagues on 27 December 1971. He returned to host the show solo at Easter 1979. In August 1972, he hosted four editions of BBC Radio 1's Junior Choice. Overlapping with his period on Blue Peter, Noakes and Shep made six series of Go With Noakes in which they travelled around Britain getting involved in diverse activities like motor racing, rowing, aerobatics and painting. In each series Noakes used a particular mode of transport to get about such as a yacht, on foot, narrow boat, or classic car. A total of 31 episodes of Go With Noakes were broadcast between 28 March 1976 and 21 December 1980.

In October 1998, Noakes joined Valerie Singleton and Peter Purves in a special programme that celebrated 40 years of Blue Peter. In January 2000, he joined his co-presenters again for the disinterment of the time capsule that they had buried in 1971.

Shep 

Noakes was encouraged to take special responsibility for one of the show's pets. His original dog was Patch, the son of Petra, the first Blue Peter dog. After Patch's sudden death in 1971 he was given another pet dog, a Border Collie puppy, named Shep by viewers. Noakes's attempts to control the excitable Shep led to his catchphrase "Get down, Shep!".

When Noakes left Blue Peter, they  offered to let him keep Shep, as the dog had lived with him since his TV debut. Despite Shep living with Noakes, the dog was always legally owned by the BBC and in rules that also applied to himself whilst under contract to the BBC, he could not use Shep for advertising or commercial purposes. Noakes was paid a stipend to cover all Shep's costs from the Blue Peter budget (as was Peter Purves for 'Petra' and later Simon Groom for 'Goldie') and as part of the agreement to keep Shep after leaving the show, Noakes agreed that the no-advertising condition should remain.

However, shortly after leaving the show, Noakes was furious to discover that what he called his "dog money" ceased to be paid by the Corporation and he confronted Biddy Baxter in a phone call. Baxter was adamant that since Shep had left Blue Peter, the programme should no longer be responsible for any of Shep's costs, although she did sympathise with some of his argument and felt that the BBC should pay Noakes for Shep to appear in Go With Noakes or for 'personal appearances' the dog made. Regardless, she later wrote that Noakes was too angry to discuss the matter and the two rarely spoke again. Soon after this angry confrontation, Noakes relinquished Shep, who went to live with Edith Menzies. Noakes subsequently appeared in a series of television advertisements for Spillers "Choice Cuts" dog food, using a dog that was indistinguishable from Shep but named Skip.

Departure and acrimony
After 12 years with Blue Peter, Noakes left the programme on 26 June 1978. By this time, his working relationship with the show's producer, Biddy Baxter, was very difficult. The bitterness would last for decades; in a 1999 interview, he reportedly said she "was an awful woman, I don't want to talk about her".

Noakes refused to appear on a special edition of Blue Peter to celebrate its twentieth birthday in October 1978 because of his poor relationship with Baxter. Eventually he was persuaded to pre-film a message for the programme, otherwise Noakes would have been the only well-known presenter to not appear. The message was shot whilst Noakes was on location filming the Go With Noakes episode "Around The Cheshire Ring", which allowed the show to explain his absence in a positive manner for the viewers. Five years later he did not appear at all for the silver anniversary programme in 1983.

On reflection, Noakes said that he was disappointed with the persona he had created on Blue Peter. Despite coming across as a natural presenter, he claimed his television personality was merely a role he played; one he once called "Idiot Noakes". He said of him: “Idiot Noakes has an extrovert personality, is light-hearted and jokey. A bit of a buffoon who would do anything for a laugh or a few pence.”

Noakes also complained about what he regarded as his low salary during his time on Blue Peter, and how he had been uninsured for many of the stunts he had undertaken. Biddy Baxter, for her part, denied Noakes's claims there was a lack of insurance for his stunts.

Later work 
In 1979, Noakes wrote a children's book, The Flight of the Magic Clog, published by Lion with illustrations by Toni Goffe. In the book, Mr. Brooks takes John, Mickey the clever one, June the talkative one, Barbara the pretty one and Eric the clumsy one on an adventure against the international villain Baron Wilhelm Doppleganger and his secret arms factory, using a giant magic flying clog.

In 1982, Noakes and his wife made an unsuccessful attempt to sail around the world; they abandoned the attempt when their boat was damaged in a hurricane. In a second attempt in 1984, the couple stopped in Majorca, Spain, where they initially planned a three-day stop, but instead settled at Andratx and ran a boat rental business. In 1983 Noakes presented The Dinosaur Trail, a seven-part documentary for Children's ITV.

Between 1986 and 1988, the BBC's programme Fax! answered questions posed by viewers. On 20 January 1987, the question "Whatever happened to John Noakes and Shep?" was posed. Noakes appeared on the show with his wife and revealed what he had been doing since retiring from television. During the course of the interview, Noakes tearfully revealed that Shep had died three days before.

In the 2000s, Noakes trained in the Michel Thomas method of language tuition, and then became a language tutor, specialising in Romance languages. In 1999, Noakes co-hosted an ITV series entitled Mad About Pets and in 2004, he took part in the Living TV reality TV show I'm Famous and Frightened!. A year later, he appeared in the Channel 5 programme Britain's Worst Celebrity Driver. On 14 June 2008, he appeared in a Blue Peter-themed edition of The Weakest Link, being voted off second. On 7 September 2013, he appeared with Peter Purves in Pointless Celebrities.

Personal life 
He married his wife, Vicky, in 1965 and the couple settled in Majorca in 1984.

On 30 June 2015, Noakes was reported missing from his home in Andratx, Majorca: he had been diagnosed with Alzheimer's disease some years before. He was found the same day, close to his home, having fallen into grass in a storm drain.

Noakes died on 28 May 2017 at the Son Espases Hospital in Palma. On 28 October 2017, half of his ashes were scattered from a firework rocket at the playing field of his former school Rishworth School. It was his wish that half his ashes were scattered at the school and the other half in Majorca.

References

External links 
John Noakes BBC Blue Peter
A view of John Noakes as a childhood icon of the 1960s and 70's

1934 births
2017 deaths
20th-century Royal Air Force personnel
Alumni of the Guildhall School of Music and Drama
Blue Peter presenters
Deaths from dementia in Spain
Deaths from Alzheimer's disease
English expatriates in Spain
English male stage actors
English male television actors
English television presenters
People from Halifax, West Yorkshire
Television personalities from West Yorkshire